Rory Robert Schlein (born 1 September 1984) is an Australian speedway rider.

Career
Born in Darwin, Northern Territory, Schlein, lived in the southern Adelaide suburb of Hallett Cove and won the Australian Under-16 Championship at the Northline Speedway in his home town of Darwin in 2000.

Schlein was signed by the Edinburgh Monarchs in 2001 and won the Conference League championship that year while on loan at Sheffield Tigers. He won the Premier League championship with the Monarchs in 2003 and won the Australian Under-21 Speedway Championship in 2003 and 2004 and finished 2nd to Chris Holder in 2005. He also won the South Australian Championship in 2004, 2005, 2006 and 2007.

He first extended season in the highest British league was for Belle Vue Aces during the 2004 Elite League speedway season. In 2005, he joined Coventry Bees and would go on to win the Elite League championship with the Bees in 2007. In between Schlein represented the Australia national speedway team at the 2006 and 2007 Speedway World Cup, where he won a bronze medal at the latter.

He was with Coventry from 2005 to 2010 with short stints at Ipswich and Peterborough in between. In 2010 he rode for Australia in the World Cup again and in 2011 won a silver medal in the 2011 World Cup although he omly rode in the rounds and not the final. Also in 2011, he joined Belle Vue again and won the Elite League Riders' Championship. From 2011 to 2016 he rode for the King's Lynn Stars and won the League Riders' championship for a second time in October 2013.

In May 2015, Schlein was seriously injured while riding for Orzeł Łódź in Poland, breaking two vertebrae and damaging his lung and kidney, ending his season and initially with concern that he could be paralysed. His recovery was documented in the film Addicted To Speed: The Rory Schlein Story. He returned to ride for King's Lynn Stars in 2016, but missed part of the early season with a shoulder injury, and after struggling to score well was dropped in August. For 2017 he has signed to ride for Ipswich Witches in the SGB Championship.

In 2020, he won the 2020 British Speedway Championship at the National Speedway Stadium in Manchester. In 2021, he helped Poole secure the SGB Championship 2021 league and cup double. He announced his retirement after the 2021 season.

In 2023, he returned to speedway signing for Wolves for the SGB Premiership 2023, he had previously ridden for them from 2017 to 2021. He also signed for Berwick Bandits for the SGB Championship 2023 and won the South Australian Championship.

Family
He is the son of the 1974 Northern Territory solo champion Lyndon Schlein.

Major results

Speedway World Cup
2006 Speedway World Cup - 4th
2007 Speedway World Cup - bronze
2010 Speedway World Cup - 5th
2011 Speedway World Cup - silver

Individual Under-21 World Championship
 2004 -  Wrocław, Olympic Stadium - 4th - 8pts (fell in the Final)

References

Australian speedway riders
1984 births
Living people
Belle Vue Aces riders
Berwick Bandits riders
Coventry Bees riders
Edinburgh Monarchs riders
Ipswich Witches riders
King's Lynn Stars riders
Peterborough Panthers riders
Sheffield Tigers riders
Wolverhampton Wolves riders